Denzil James (born 12 December 1982) is a Trinidadian cricketer. He played in eight first-class matches for Trinidad and Tobago in 2001/02 and 2002/03.

See also
 List of Trinidadian representative cricketers

References

External links
 

1982 births
Living people
Trinidad and Tobago cricketers